The Cole House is a historic house in Nashville, Tennessee, USA. It has been listed on the National Register of Historic Places since December 27, 1974.

References

Houses on the National Register of Historic Places in Tennessee
Houses in Nashville, Tennessee
National Register of Historic Places in Nashville, Tennessee